Karl Wilhelm Valentiner (22 February 1845 in Eckernförde – 1 April 1931) was a German astronomer.

Life
In 1874, Wilhelm Valentiner led a successful German expedition to Zhifu (China) to observe a solar eclipse. 1875, He took over the directorship of the Mannheim Observatory in 1875. Since the observing conditions in the Mannheim city centre were deteriorating, Grand Duke Frederick I of Baden approved Valentiner's request to relocate the observatory in Karlsruhe in 1880. The telescope, however, was located in a makeshift hut in Karlsruhe Nymphenburg Park. Much to the annoyance of Valentiner, now appointed Professor of the University of Karlsruhe, no new observatory was built. He decided to apply for a position at Königstuhl near Heidelberg. 

After the establishment of the "Grand Duchy Mountain Observatory" (today's Heidelberg-Königstuhl State Observatory) in the year 1898 Valentiner was placed over the Department of Astrometry, which stood in competition with the Astrophysics Department under Max Wolf. When Valentiner retired in 1909 the two departments were merged under the direction of Wolf.

Works
 Astronomische Bilder, Leipzig, 1881
 Handwörterbuch der Astronomie, Breslau, 1897–1902 (online: Band 1, Band 2, Band 3, Teil 1, Band 3, Teil 2, Band 4)

1845 births
1931 deaths
People from Eckernförde
19th-century German astronomers
20th-century German astronomers